The Upton Park Trophy is awarded to the winners of an annual association football match in the Channel Islands between the champions of Guernsey's Priaulx League and Jersey's Football Combination.  The venue alternates each year between Guernsey and Jersey: in Guernsey it is usually held at The Track, and in Jersey at Springfield Stadium. Whilst the match is between the Guernsey and Jersey league champions, the trophy belongs to the Guernsey F.A. and the competition is run by them.

The trophy was donated to the Guernsey F.A. by Upton Park F.C. to mark their tenth consecutive annual visit to the island, which they made in 1906.

The term "Upton" is often used to describe other inter-insular sporting events between Channel Island clubs. There is also an under 18s "Upton" called the Portsmouth Trophy and also one for under 16s called the John Leatt Trophy.

Past results
The home club is listed first.

Winners/runners-up by club

References

External links
 Channel Islands - List of Champions, RSSSF.com

Sport in the Channel Islands
Football in Guernsey
Football in Jersey
Recurring sporting events established in 1907
1907 establishments in the British Empire